Vica or VICA may refer to:

 SkillsUSA, a career and technical student organization originally known as the Vocational Industrial Clubs of America
 Valley Industry & Commerce Association, in the San Fernando Valley in metropolitan Los Angeles
 Vica (born 1961), former Brazilian football player and manager

Places 
 Viča (disambiguation), a Serbo-Croatian toponym
 Vića, a village in Sarajevo, Bosnia and Herzegovina
 Vica River, a river of Romania
 Vica, a village in Gurasada,  Hunedoara County, Romania